Chinese Championships or Chinese Championship may refer to:

 Chinese National Championships
 Chinese Artistic Gymnastics Championships
 Chinese Chess Championship
 Chinese Figure Skating Championships
 Chinese Go Championship
 Chinese Super League (football)

 Other
 China Championship (snooker)
 China F4 Championship
 China Superbike Championship
 China Touring Car Championship